= Franc Contreras =

American journalist of Mexican descent

Franc Contreras is an American journalist of Mexican descent. He is based in Mexico City where he is a correspondent.

Originally from Tucson, Arizona, Contreras has been living and writing from Mexico City and around Latin America since 1996.

His previous works have been broadcast on Al Jazeera English television, BBC World Service Radio and television, CBS Radio and TV, CBC Radio in Canada and Public Radio International in the United States.

Contreras has filed hundreds of news reports with political analysis from an array of countries including Argentina, Bolivia, Colombia, Guatemala, Haiti, Nicaragua, Panama and Venezuela.

He studied for a Master's degree in journalism at University of Iowa.
